Sri Kanaka Maha Lakshmi is the presiding deity of Visakhapatnam locals. The temple is located in Burujupeta of Visakhapatnam city.

References

Devi temples in Andhra Pradesh
Hindu temples in Visakhapatnam district